MacSwiney is a surname. Notable people with the surname include:

Mary MacSwiney (1872–1942), Irish politician and educationalist
Rev. Patrick MacSwiney (1885–1940), Irish Catholic priest and historian
Seán MacSwiney, Irish Sinn Féin politician
Terence MacSwiney (1879–1920), Sinn Féin Lord Mayor of Cork during the Irish War of Independence, died on hunger strike in British jail
Muriel MacSwiney, Irish nationalist
Máire MacSwiney Brugha, Irish author